Northern Inland Football is an association football competition based in the Northern Inland Region of New South Wales extending from Quirindi in the South to Tenterfield in the North. The association was established in its current form in 2006, having previously been known as the separate entities of North West Soccer Association and New England Soccer. Its offices are located in Tamworth, the largest city in the region.

The Northern Inland Premier League has been run under various names since 1995. The competition is conducted by Northern New South Wales Football, the governing body in the region.

Clubs
There are over 20 clubs in the region:

Premier Division Structure
In the 2022 season the competition has reverted to a 7 team home and away competition. 

 Hillvue Rovers
 Kootingal Kougars
 Moore Creek Mountain Goats
 South United
 North Companions
 Oxley Vale Attunga FC
 Tamworth Football Club

Honours

|}
Source:

References

External links

Northern New South Wales Football

Soccer leagues in New South Wales